The Corigliano d'Otranto railway station is a railway station in Corigliano d'Otranto, Italy. The station is located on the Lecce-Otranto railway. The train services and the railway infrastructure are operated by Ferrovie del Sud Est.

Train services
The station is served by the following service:

References

Railway stations in Apulia
Railway stations opened in 1896
Buildings and structures in the Province of Lecce